Vincenzo Flauti (1782–1863) was an Italian mathematician.

Life and work 
Flauti studied at the Liceo del Salvatore, the school led by Nicola Fergola. Although he began medical studies, he changed them to mathematics influenced by his master Fergola. He taught at the University of Naples from 1803 to 1860, succeeding Fergola in his chair in 1812.

In 1860, when the Kingdom of the Two Sicilies was conquered by Giuseppe Garibaldi and was incorporated into the Kingdom of Italy, Flauti was excluded from the Academy of Sciences of Naples and from his docent duties, because he had been a supporter of the Bourbon monarchy.

Flauti was the leader of the synthetic school of mathematics founded by Fergola. In 1807, jointly with Felice Giannattasio, he was entrusted by the Bourbon government to write a mathematics textbook for all schoolchildren in the kingdom.

References

Bibliography

External links 
 
 
 

19th-century Italian mathematicians
1782 births
1863 deaths
Academic staff of the University of Naples Federico II
Mathematics educators